Andrew Pyle may refer to:

 Andrew Pyle (philosopher) (born 1955), British philosopher
 Andrew Pyle (economist) (born 1963), Canadian economist
Andy Pyle (born 1946), musician